Battles of Syracuse may refer to:

 First and Second Battles of Syracuse in 415 and 414 BC, where Athens fought the Syracusans and Spartans
 Battle of Syracuse in 397 BC, during one of the Carthaginian campaigns in Sicily.
 Siege of Syracuse in 212 BC, between the city of Syracuse, and a Roman army under Marcellus sent to put down the city's uprising. The battle that Archimedes held off for two years and the battle that killed Archimedes
 Battle of Syracuse (1710), a naval battle in the War of the Spanish Succession between French and British fleets.